Zakrzów is a district in the city of Tarnobrzeg, Poland.

The village of Zakrzów in Podkarpackie Voivodeship, Poland, belonged to the Tarnowski family, and in the 19th century, its population was app. 400. It was annexed by Tarnobrzeg on October 1, 1976. It is located in northern part of the town, bordering Dzików, Sobów, Sielec and Piastów.

Districts of Tarnobrzeg